Sihuas is a town in the Sihuas District of the Sihuas Province in the Ancash Region of Peru.

References

Populated places in the Ancash Region